The following railroads operate in the U.S. state of Maryland.

Common freight carriers
Canadian Pacific Railway through subsidiary Delaware and Hudson Railway (trackage rights, not used)
Canton Railroad (CTN)
CSX Transportation (CSXT)
Delmarva Central Railroad (DCR)
Georges Creek Railway (GCK)
Maryland and Delaware Railroad (MDDE)
Maryland Midland Railway (MMID)
Norfolk Southern Railway (NS)
Tradepoint Rail (TPR)
Wheeling and Lake Erie Railway (WE)
Winchester and Western Railroad (WW)

Passenger carriers
Amtrak (AMTK)
Baltimore Streetcar Museum
Maryland Transit Administration for its MARC operations, the Baltimore Metro Subway, the Baltimore Light RailLink, and the Purple Line (under construction)
National Capital Trolley Museum
Western Maryland Scenic Railroad
Walkersville Southern Railroad
Washington Metro

Defunct railroads

Electric railways 
Baltimore and Bel Air Electric Railway
Baltimore, Halethorpe and Elkridge Railway
Baltimore, Sparrow's Point and Chesapeake Railway
Blue Ridge Railway
Capital Traction Company
City and Suburban Railway
Cumberland Electric Railway
Cumberland and Westernport Electric Railway
Frederick Railroad
Frederick and Middletown Railroad
Hagerstown Railway
Hagerstown and Frederick Railway
Kensington Railway
Loraine Electric Railway
Maryland Electric Railways
North Beach Railway
Potomac and Severn Electric Railway: 1899–1900, to Washington and Annapolis Electric Railway
Towson and Cockeysville Electric Railway; 1912–1924, shuttle between Northern Central's Timonium Station and the Towson Courthouse
United Railways and Electric Company
Washington and Annapolis Electric Railway: 1900–1902, to Washington, Baltimore and Annapolis Electric Railway
Washington, Baltimore and Annapolis Electric Railroad (WB&A): 1911–1935, to Baltimore and Annapolis Railroad
Washington, Baltimore and Annapolis Electric Railway: 1902–1911, to Washington, Baltimore and Annapolis Electric Railroad
Washington, Berwyn and Laurel Electric Railway
Washington Railway and Electric Company
Washington and Glen Echo Railroad
Washington and Great Falls Electric Railway
Washington Interurban Railway
Washington and Maryland Railway
Washington and Rockville Railway
Washington, Spa Spring and Gretta Railway
Washington, Woodside and Forest Glen Railway and Power Company

Private carriers 
Eckhart Branch Railroad
Georges Creek Railroad
Green Ridge Railroad
Maryland Mining Company
Mount Savage Railroad

Passenger carriers 
Indian Head Central Railway

Ghost railroads 
 Baltimore and Drum Point Railroad

See also

List of railroad lines in the Delmarva Peninsula

Notes

References
Association of American Railroads (2003), Railroad Service in Maryland.  Retrieved May 12, 2005.

 
 
Maryland
Railroads